The 1975–76 Egyptian Premier League, was the 19th season of the Egyptian Premier League, the top Egyptian professional league for association football clubs, since its establishment in 1948. The season started on 26 September 1975 and concluded on 21 May 1976.
Al Ahly managed to win the league for the 13th time in the club's history.

League table

Group 1

 (Q)= Qualification to Championship play-off, (R)= Relegated, Pld = Matches played; W = Matches won; D = Matches drawn; L = Matches lost; F = Goals for; A = Goals against; ± = Goal difference; Pts = Points.

Group 2

 (Q)= Qualification to Championship play-off, (R)= Relegated, Pld = Matches played; W = Matches won; D = Matches drawn; L = Matches lost; F = Goals for; A = Goals against; ± = Goal difference; Pts = Points.

Final stage

Championship play-off matches

Al Ahly won 5–0 on aggregate.

Top goalscorers

References

External links 
 All Egyptian Competitions Info

5
1975–76 in African association football leagues
1975–76 in Egyptian football